Camillo Bazzoni (29 December 1934 – 8 October 2020) was an Italian cinematographer and film director.

Career
Born in Salsomaggiore Terme, Bazzoni started as camera operator in 1960. From 1967 he worked as cinematographer with, among others, Lina Wertmüller, Mario Monicelli, Salvatore Samperi, Massimo Troisi, and Franco Rossi. He was also a second unit camera operator on Warren Beatty's Reds.

After a series of documentaries and short films, in 1968 Bazzoni debuted as a film director with Macaroni Combat, Suicide Commando, and a Spaghetti Western, A Long Ride from Hell.

He was the younger brother of the director Luigi Bazzoni and the brother-in-law of Academy Award winner Vittorio Storaro.

References

External links 
 

1934 births
2020 deaths
People from Salsomaggiore Terme
Italian film directors
Italian screenwriters
Spaghetti Western directors
Italian cinematographers
Italian male screenwriters